Vidovec Krapinski is a village in the municipality of Krapina, in Krapina-Zagorje County, Croatia.

References

Populated places in Krapina-Zagorje County